The Embassy of the Republic of Korea in Ireland is the diplomatic mission of South Korea in Ireland. It is located in the capital of Ireland, Dublin.

The current South Korean ambassador to Ireland is Mr. Ki-hwan Kweon, who presented their credentials to the Irish President on 25 September 2020.

History 
South Korea established diplomatic relations with Ireland in 1983, and subsequently opened an embassy on 10 June 1987.

Building 
The South Korea embassy is located on Clyde Road in South Dublin.

See also 

 Foreign relations of Ireland
 List of diplomatic missions in Ireland

References 

Diplomatic missions in Dublin (city)
Diplomatic missions of South Korea